The 2012–14 European Nations Cup First Division is the premier rugby union competition below the Six Nations Championship in Europe. It is divided into two tiers; Division 1A and Division 1B.

The divisions play on a two-year cycle with the teams playing each other both home and away. From 2009 onward, the title is awarded according to a one-year ranking.

The competition has been slightly altered for the 2012–14 edition. The top tier Division 1A has seen the relegation of Ukraine to Division 1B. They have been replaced with Belgium, who finished at the top of Division 1B in the 2010–12 season. The bottom tier division 1B has seen the relegation of the Netherlands to the European Nations Cup Second Division. They have been replaced by Sweden who won promotion from Division 2A.

The champions of 1B will be promoted to Division 1A for the 2015–16 season, while the last placed team in each division will be relegated.

2015 Rugby World Cup qualifying

As with the 2008–2010 tournament, this edition will also serve a role in the qualification process for the 2015 Rugby World Cup.

The top two teams at the end of the overall ENC Division 1A 2013–14 tournament will qualify directly for the 2015 Rugby World Cup. The third placed team will enter a playoff series against the champions of Division 1B and the leaders of the four levels of the ENC Second Division as of the end of the 2012–2013 season. The winner of this playoff will advance to the repechage playoff against teams from other continents.

Format
Table points are determined as follows:
4 points for a win
2 points for a draw
0 point for a loss
1 bonus point for scoring 4 tries in a match
1 bonus point for losing by 7 points or fewer

Division 1A

2013

Table

Pre-tournament IRB rankings in parentheses

Games

2014

Table

Games

Table 2013–2014

Division 1B

2012–13

Table

Pre-tournament rankings in parentheses

Games

Goalpost crossbars were fixed at 4m, instead of 3m.

Season 2013–14

Games

Table 2012–2014

See also
European Nations Cup (rugby union)
Rugby Europe
Six Nations Championship
Antim Cup
2015 Rugby World Cup qualifying

References

External links
FIRA-AER official website

2012-14
2012–13 in European rugby union
2013–14 in European rugby union
2012 rugby union tournaments for national teams
2013 rugby union tournaments for national teams
2014 rugby union tournaments for national teams